Jalan Kim Chuan, or Jalan Batu Unjur, Federal Route 3218 (formerly Selangor state route B8), is an industrial federal road in Klang District, Selangor, Malaysia.

At most sections, the Federal Route 3218 was built under the JKR R5 road standard, with a speed limit of 90 km/h.

List of junctions

References

Malaysian Federal Roads